Colorado's 24th Senate district is one of 35 districts in the Colorado Senate. It has been represented by Democrat Kyle Mullica since 2023. Prior to redistricting the district was represented by Democrat Faith Winter and Republican Beth Martinez Humenik.

Geography
District 24 covers the northern suburbs of Denver in Adams County, including most of Northglenn and parts of Thornton and Westminster.

The district overlaps with Colorado's 6th and 7th congressional districts, and with the 31st, 34th, 35th, and 56th districts of the Colorado House of Representatives.

Recent election results
Colorado state senators are elected to staggered four-year terms; under normal circumstances, the 24th district holds elections in midterm years. The 2022 election will be the first held under the state's new district lines.

2022
Thanks to redistricting, Senator Faith Winter is running for re-election in the 25th district in 2022, and State Rep. Kyle Mullica is running for the 24th district in her stead.

Historical election results

2018

2014

Federal and statewide results in District 24

References 

24
Adams County, Colorado